Robert "Red" Robinson OBC (born March 30, 1937 in Comox, British Columbia) is a Canadian disc jockey. He was the first disc jockey to play rock and roll music, in Vancouver, British Columbia.

Honours
In July 2016, Robinson was appointed to the Order Of British Columbia, the highest form of recognition by the BC government.

References

External links
 Official website
 Facebook
 Twitter
 Instagram
 Spotify
 Apple Podcasts
 iHeartRadio

Canadian radio personalities
People from Comox, British Columbia
1937 births
Living people